Nicholas Roger Prowting (born 26 October 1985) is an English cricketer. Prowting is a right-handed batsman who bowls right-arm medium pace. He was born in Chelmsford, Essex.

While studying for his degree at Durham University, Prowting made his first-class debut for Durham UCCE against Surrey in 2006. He made eight further first-class appearances for the university, the last of which came against Lancashire in 2008. In his nine first-class matches, he scored 314 runs at an average of 19.62, with a high score of 78. This score, his only first-class fifty, came against Nottinghamshire in 2007.

His brother, Christopher, played first-class cricket for the Marylebone Cricket Club in 2007.

References

External links
Nick Prowting at ESPNcricinfo
Nick Prowting at CricketArchive

1985 births
Living people
Sportspeople from Chelmsford
Alumni of Durham University
English cricketers
Durham MCCU cricketers